Lovely Hoffman is an American recording artist, musical theater performer, record producer, musician, actress and educator. She is best known for her 2017 breakout single "My Black Is Beautiful", a song she wrote to address low self-esteem among young girls of color.  In 2010, Lovely established herself in the theatre arts world when she was cast to co-star alongside Broadway star Marissa Perry in a production of Hairspray the musical, which was directed by Todd Michel Smith and Judine Somerville both cast members of the original Broadway production. She received notable recognition in 2007 when her debut single, "Can't Wait" peaked #10 on the urban college radio charts. Lovely has also performed and shared the stage with other notable R&B artists including Grammy Award-winning singer and songwriter Ne-Yo and multi-platinum recording artist and producer T-Pain.

Early life and education
Hoffman was born in Roxbury, Massachusetts, a neighborhood of Boston. Her father is a pastor and she grew up singing in her father’s church. Growing up, she struggled with self-esteem and credits Brandy Norwood as one of her influences and inspiration for helping overcome some of her insecurities. Hoffman attended Boston College for both her undergraduate and graduate studies. She majored in Political Science, Communications and minored in Music. She received her Masters in Education.

Theatre
In September 2013, Hoffman was cast in the lead role of Celie for a New England production of The Color Purple, a role which Whoopi Goldberg originally portrayed in the Steven Spielberg directed film based on the 1982 Pulitzer Prize-winning novel by Alice Walker. Produced by Speakeasy Stage Company, the show opened January 10, 2014 as a Boston premiere. Lovely received an IRNE Award for best actress in a musical for her performance. In October 2019, Lovely starred as Sister Rosetta Tharpe, who is often referred to as the "Godmother of Rock & Roll," in the Greater Boston Stage Company production of Marie and Rosetta, a play with music written by George Brant, that chronicles the legendary American gospel singer and guitarist’s time with her protegee, Marie Knight, who together, rose to become a great gospel duo.

Music
As a former middle-school history teacher, Hoffman noticed that young black girls were self-conscious about their appearance and as a result lacked confidence, which correlated to their academic achievement. She wrote a song "My Black Is Beautiful," to address low self-esteem issues among teenage girls of color. The song achieved wide popularity and gained significant public media attention for challenging beauty standards and empowering young school-aged girls of color with confidence in order to improve their performance in school. Hoffman explained why she wrote the song and its cultural significance with CNN on National Teacher Day on May 9, 2017. The single was released in February, 2017, and rose to #45 on the Urban Adult Contemporary radio charts, making it Hoffman’s first release to gain mainstream success. The music video went viral after being featured and shared online by several publications and media outlets.

Theatre performance

Singles

References

American women singer-songwriters
American women pianists
American contemporary R&B singers
American musical theatre actresses
Record producers from Massachusetts
American women record producers
Living people
Year of birth missing (living people)
American singer-songwriters
21st-century American women